"Moxon's Master" is a short story by American writer Ambrose Bierce, which speculates on the nature of life and intelligence. It describes a chess-playing automaton that murders its creator. First published in The San Francisco Examiner on  April 16, 1899, it is one of the first descriptions of a robot in English-language literature written much before the word 'robot' came to be used. The story was included in the 1910 edition of the short story anthology Can Such Things Be?.

Plot summary

The master, Moxon, who creates a chess-playing automaton, boasts to the narrator that even though machines have no brains, they can still think and demonstrate intelligence or mind and therefore should be treated just like men of flesh and blood. After a thorough discussion about what it means to "think" and what is the nature of "intelligence", the narrator leaves Moxon's house in confusion. 

The narrator returns to Moxon's house later in the midst of a rainstorm to learn more. He enters secretly and finds Moxon playing chess with an automaton. Moxon wins the game. This agitates the automaton who kills him in a fit of rage. Lightning strikes the room. The house is engulfed in flames. The narrator loses consciousness.

The narrator wakes up in a hospital room where Haley, Moxon's servant, tells him that he saved him from imminent death. Haley corroborates the details. Nevertheless, the narrator questions whether what he saw was real.

Analysis
Moxon declares that intelligence is endemic in all inanimate and animate objects. This is a theory known as panpsychism. The ancient Greek philosopher Thales and William James espoused this view. Mind is inherent in all of the universe and in being.

The story alludes to Johann Maelzel's chess player, an automaton who was able to challenge humans to chess matches. The device had been invented by Wolfgang von Kempelen. The "red fez" in the story is a reference to this figure, known as the Turk. Edgar Allan Poe had written an analysis of the chess-playing automaton in 1836, "Maelzel's Chess Player", offering an explanation of how the illusion was accomplished.

The main theme of the story is not only whether machines can think as we know it, but whether they can equal or even excel human beings. Can the automaton think because he has intelligence and can play a game developed by humans such as chess? Moxon argues that he can. Moreover, the automaton is angry and becomes homicidal after he loses. These are emotions typically ascribed to human beings. This is the unknown or X-Factor in the story. By thinking, does the automaton also acquire other traits, such as emotions? Like in humans, do these render the automaton as someone who has free will and who is unpredictable?

Finally, the title suggests that the automaton is the "master", not Moxon. This raises the question of whether the automaton's intelligence can potentially become superior to that of its maker, the human, Moxon. This is the future danger alluded to in the story. The automaton becomes the master of the man.

See also
List of fictional robots and androids 
  The Turk
 Walker Chess-player

Sources
 Grenander, M.E. Ambrose Bierce. NY: Twayne Publishers, 1971.
 McWilliams, Carey (1929; reprinted 1967). Ambrose Bierce: A Biography, Archon Books.
 
 
 O'Conner, Richard (1967). Ambrose Bierce: a Biography, with illustrations, Boston, Little, Brown and Company.

External links

 Full text of the short story
 

1899 short stories
Science fiction short stories
Short stories by Ambrose Bierce
Robots in literature
Chess automatons
Short stories about chess
1899 in chess
Fiction set in 1899